Kangzhuang may refer to:

 Kangzhuang, Beijing, China
 Kangzhuang, Hebei, China
 Kangzhuang railway station, Beijing, China
 Kangzhuang station, Chongqing, China